Arthur Melville Benedict (March 31, 1862 – January 14, 1948) was a National League second baseman. Benedict played for the Philadelphia Quakers in the  season. In three career games, he had 4 hits in 15 at-bats, with 4 RBIs. He batted and threw right-handed.

Benedict was born in Cornwall, Illinois and died in Denver, Colorado.

External links

 

1862 births
1948 deaths
Philadelphia Quakers players
Major League Baseball second basemen
Baseball players from Illinois
19th-century baseball players
People from Henry County, Illinois